Chal Bardar (also Romanized as Chāl Bardār and Chāl Bar Dar) is a village in Pian Rural District, in the Central District of Izeh County, Khuzestan Province, Iran. At the 2006 census, its population was 163, in 27 families.

References 

Populated places in Izeh County